François-Joseph Mobutu Nzanga Ngbangawe (born 24 March 1970 in Kinshasa) is a Congolese politician. A son of the long-time President Mobutu Sese Seko, he served in the government of the Democratic Republic of the Congo under President Joseph Kabila from 2007 to 2011, initially as Minister of State for Agriculture and subsequently as Deputy Prime Minister for Basic Social Needs. He was dismissed from the government in March 2011. In 2008, he founded the Union of Mobutist Democrats as the successor to his father's Popular Movement of the Revolution and has led the party since.

Background

Nzanga Mobutu is the eldest son of Mobutu Sese Seko by his second wife, Bobi Ladawa. Nzanga studied in Belgium, France and Canada before returning to Congo in the mid-1990s. He then worked as a communications adviser to his father but fled into exile in Morocco along with his father when rebel leader Laurent-Désiré Kabila captured Kinshasa in May 1997.

2006 election
He launched a political career as leader of the Union of Mobutist Democrats (UDEMO), a party advocating the restoration of peace, national unity and territorial integrity. He is most popular in the northwestern province of Équateur, whence his father hailed. In the 2006 presidential election, he ran as a candidate and placed fourth, with about 4.8% of the vote. Following the first round of voting, Mobutu entered into a platform political coalition with the incumbent president Joseph Kabila to try to rally votes from the Equateur region where Jean-Pierre Bemba was favored to win. The coalition also involved the political party PALU of Antoine Gizenga.

His younger brother, Giala Mobutu, and eight other UDEMO candidates were elected to the National Assembly in the 2006 election.

Government minister
Gizenga became Prime Minister in December 2006, and Mobutu was named Minister of State for Agriculture when Gizenga's government was announced on February 5, 2007, ranking second in the government after Gizenga. When Gizenga was succeeded by Adolphe Muzito, Mobutu was appointed as Deputy Prime Minister for Basic Social Needs in Muzito's government, which was named on October 26, 2008. In March 2011 President Kabila dismissed Mobutu from the government for inactivity. Explaining the move, government spokesman Lambert Mende accused Mobutu of "abandonment of service" for staying in Europe since November 2010 "without any explanation". Mende stressed that the move was directed only against Mobutu and not his party. Reportedly Kabila had tried to cultivate a good relationship with Mobutu, but the latter allegedly neglected his work and seemed uninterested in it. Following his dismissal, he again ran for office in the 2011 presidential elections against the incumbent president. In subsequent years he lived in the United States, with his brother Giala leading UDEMO.

He is married to Catherine Bemba, a daughter of businessman Bemba Saolona and sister of Jean-Pierre Bemba, with whom he has three children: Nyiwa, Bobi, and Sese.

Election results

References

External links
 Personal website

Living people
1970 births
Ngbandi people
Union of Mobutuist Democrats politicians
Candidates for President of the Democratic Republic of the Congo
Deputy Prime Ministers of the Democratic Republic of the Congo
Children of national leaders
Mobutu Sese Seko